Speckled Wood may refer to:

Species
 Speckled wood (butterfly) (Pararge aegeria), a species of butterfly found throughout the Palearctic realm
 Madeiran speckled wood (Pararge xiphia), a species of butterfly found on the island of Madeira
 Canary speckled wood (Pararge xiphioides), a species of butterfly found on the Canary Islands
 Speckled wood pigeon (Columba hodgsonii), a species of bird found in Asia
 Speckled wood-lily (Clintonia umbellulata), a species of flowering plant native to the eastern United States

Places
Speckled Wood, Hastings, a woodland area in East Sussex, United Kingdom

Animal common name disambiguation pages